Old Campus most often refers to the oldest area of the Yale University campus in New Haven, Connecticut.

Old Campus or Old Campus Historic District may also refer to:

Georgia Institute of Technology Historic District, in Atlanta, Georgia
University of Minnesota Old Campus Historic District, in Minneapolis, Minnesota
Old Campus Historic District (St. Lawrence University), in Canton, New York
Elmira College Old Campus, a historic area of Elmira College in Elmira, New York
Old Campus District, University of South Carolina, in Columbia, South Carolina